Celeste is a 2018 Australian film directed by Ben Hackworth and written by Hackworth and Bille Brown. The film stars Radha Mitchell, Thomas Cocquerel, Nadine Garner and Odessa Young. The film had its international premiere at BFI London Film Festival and its world premiere at Melbourne International Film Festival.

Plot 

Celeste (Radha Mitchell) was once Australia’s most beloved opera singer. She retired early for the man she loved to live on a crumbling and beautiful estate in the heart of a rainforest in tropical North Queensland. Ten years after the tragic death of her husband, Celeste is ready to make one final return to the stage. Her stepson Jack (Thomas Cocquerel, still haunted by the past, arrives at her behest amidst the preparations for the performance and finds Celeste is as he remembered. She wants him to stay at the estate, but needs him to perform one last request. Celeste is set in a bohemian world of opera and showcases a stunning and unseen part of the world.

Cast 
 Radha Mitchell as Celeste
 Thomas Cocquerel as Jack
 Nadine Garner as Grace
 Odessa Young as Rita
 Emm Wiseman as Cindy
 Aaron Davison as Stu

Reception

Critical response 
Review aggregator website, Rotten Tomatoes gave it  rating, based on  reviews. Neil Young of The Hollywood Reporter said, "Exuding a brittle wistfulness as a retired opera star planning one last comeback, Mitchell's forty-something Celeste nevertheless manages to combine elements of Norma Desmond and Blanche DuBois to absorbing effect." Sarah Ward from Screen International stated the film "follow in the footsteps of Rainer Werner Fassbinder’s great female-led films, but always taking the time to revel in the emotional details. It’s an approach that gives the film’s characters room to grow, and its performances along with them, immersing the audience in a heady mix of loss, love, loyalty, redemption and deep-felt yet ever-shifting bonds."

Accolades

References

External links 
 

2018 films
Australian musical drama films
2010s English-language films